Thanawat "Yong" Gaweenuntawong (born 6 May 1967) is a Thai professional darts player.

Darts Career
Thanawat made his Professional Darts Corporation (PDC) debut at the 2014 PDC World Cup of Darts in Hamburg, Germany, representing Thailand alongside Watanyu Charonrooj. They were whitewashed 5–0 in the first round by England's Phil Taylor and Adrian Lewis. Thanawat also competed at the 2015 and 2016 World Cup events with Attapol Eupakaree, again losing in the first round on each occasion.

Thanawat won the South-East Asian Qualifier for the 2016 PDC World Darts Championship, defeating Malaysia's Tengku Hadzali Shah in the final to become the first player from Thailand to qualify for a World Championship. He played against Germany's René Eidams in the qualifying round, losing 2–0 in a low-quality contest that saw both players average below 70. The Thai team were defeated 4–2 by Greece in the first round of the 2017 World Cup.

Thanawat quit of the PDC in May 2021.

World Championship results

PDC
 2016: Preliminary round (lost to René Eidams 0–2) (sets)

References

External links

Living people
Thanawat Gaweenuntawong
Place of birth missing (living people)
1967 births
Thanawat Gaweenuntawong
Thanawat Gaweenuntawong